Bruce Patton Summerhays (born February 14, 1944) is an American professional golfer. He served as a mission president for the Church of Jesus Christ of Latter-day Saints in Tampa, Florida.

Career
Summerhays was born in St. Louis, Missouri. He attended the University of Utah and turned professional in 1966. Summerhays spent his regular (under 50) career competing in mainly local events, but as a senior he has competed successfully on the Champions Tour. He has won three Champions Tour events and over $9 million in prize money.

Personal life
Summerhays is a member of the Church of Jesus Christ of Latter-day Saints, and says his favorite books are the Book of Mormon and the Bible.  He and his wife, Carolyn, are the parents of eight children and have 30 grandchildren.

Summerhays' daughter, Carrie Summerhays Roberts, an All-American golfer at Brigham Young University, played on the LPGA Tour and is now the women's golf coach for BYU. Two of his nephews are also professional golfers; Daniel plays on the PGA Tour, and Boyd plays on PGA Tour Canada.

Professional wins (7)

Other wins (4)
1974 Northern California Open
1979 Northern California PGA Championship
1991 Utah PGA Championship
2008 Utah Open

Champions Tour wins (3)

Champions Tour playoff record (1–1)

U.S. national team appearances
PGA Cup: 1977 (tie), 1978

References

External links

American male golfers
PGA Tour Champions golfers
Golf course architects
Golfers from St. Louis
Golfers from Utah
American Latter Day Saints
University of Utah alumni
People from Farmington, Utah
1944 births
Living people